The Men's Omnium event at the 2010 South American Games was held on March 21. The five events of the competition (200m sprint, scratch race, 3,000m pursuit, points race and kilometer time trial) were held on the same day.

Medalists

Results

Sprint 200m

Scratch Race

Distance: 20 laps (5 km)

Individual Pursuit

Points Race
Distance: 60 laps (15 km) with 6 sprint
Elapsed time: 19:56.090
Average Speed: 45.147 km/h

Kilometer Time Trial

Final standings

References
Sprint 200m
Scratch Race
Pursuit
Points Race
Kilometer
Classification

Omnium M
Men's omnium